Ashenda (Tigrinya: ኣሸንዳ; Amharic: አሸንዳ) is a national festival celebrated by Tigray (Ethiopia), Agew (Ethiopia) Amhara (Ethiopia). Ashenda also known as "Girls’ day" is a festival awaited by Habesha women of all ages. Although Ashenda is celebrated primarily by teenage girls,  females of all age group get to participate in this national festival, during this festival men are expected to be on their best behavior. Habesha girls prepare for the celebration of Ashenda in leading months. Prior to the celebration, groups of girls make preparations for the holiday by buying new clothes, visiting hairdressers, preparing drums and harvesting the distinctive 'Ashenda' grass (which will be tied around their waist for the celebration).
The holiday started as a cultural one, but evolved to a religious one. Its origin can be traced to ancient Israel a common way Hebrew women celebrated their Holidays, victory, heroes (Exodus 15:20) After the introduction of Christianity into Ethiopia in the 4th century AD the celebration began to have religious tone and merge with Christian beliefs, those celebrating it now see it as a commemoration of the heavenly ascension of the Virgin Mary following her Dormition, a feast called Filseta. It is typically celebrated between 16 and 26 August every year.

Celebration 
On the first day, the Ashenda girls gather together and make the journey to their local Church of St. Mary (or any other Orthodox Tewahedo Church in the community), playing music and dancing. They then go around the entire village, expressing their thanks to each household in the community. The Ashenda girls spend around 20 minutes at each house, entertaining families and themselves, before being bid farewell usually with gifts of money, food or drink. After the door to door celebrations, the girls find a suitable field in or near the village, spending between a day to a week dancing and playing in the field while passing men are urged to provide gifts of money.

All money and gifts collected over the course of the celebration are then donated to a charity, the Church or other events.

Name 
Ashenda is named after the long, thin "Ashenda" grass which girls tie to hang down from their waists in a fashionable pattern. The Ashenda grass has come to symbolize the religious festival, as dancing girls move their waists causing the leaves to shake in an eye-catching manner. The festival also called "Shadey", "Ashendye", "Aynewari", "Solel", and "Ingicha".

See also 
 Filseta

References

Further reading

External links
Ethiopian Magnificent Holidays: A Case Study of the Ashenda Festival
Ashenda - Girls Feast
This is Africa
Ashendiye/Ashenda – girls’ festival – celebrated in North Ethiopia

Ethiopian Orthodox Tewahedo Church
Eritrean Orthodox Tewahedo Church
Great Feasts of the Orthodox Church
Marian feast days
August observances
Festivals in Ethiopia
Festivals in Eritrea